Prodan Gligorijević, known simply as Hadži-Prodan (1760 – 1825) was a Serbian voivode (military commander) in the First Serbian Uprising of the Serbian Revolution, then the Greek War of Independence, against the Ottoman Empire. He led an unsuccessful rebellion in 1814, dubbed Hadži Prodan's Revolt.

Life
Prodan Gligorijević was born around 1760, and he hailed from Nevade, near Takovo, modern Gornji Milanovac (then Despotovac). His epithet, hajji, derives from honorific title given to Christians that complete the pilgrimage to the Holy Land (Jerusalem).

He joined the fighting in 1806. Prodan participated in the battles of Sjenica, Nova Varoš, Prijepolje, Bijelo Polje, and Suvodol (1809). After the fall of the uprising (Hursid Pasha captured Belgrade in October 1813), his unit stayed in Mučnja for some months. He gave himself up to the Ottomans and settled in the Trnava monastery in Čačak.

As the Ottoman tyranny continued, he was put to lead the rebellion in the Požega nahija. His badly organized rebellion against the Ottomans in the Čačak region in 1814, known as Hadži Prodan's Revolt, was quickly beaten. He fled first to Austria in 1815, then Wallachia, where he joined the Greek War of Independence in 1821. He died in 1825.

See also
Giorgakis Olympios (1772–1821), fellow Greek revolutionary in the First Serbian Uprising and Greek War
Vasos Mavrovouniotis (1797–1847), fellow Montenegrin Serb revolutionary in the Greek War
Hadži-Prodan's Cave
List of Serbian Revolutionaries

References

Sources
Хаџи Продан Глигоријевић војвода Старог Влаха 
Хаџи Проданова буна

18th-century Serbian nobility
19th-century Serbian nobility
Serbian revolutionaries
People of the First Serbian Uprising
Serb volunteers in the Greek War of Independence
Šumadija
1760 births
1825 deaths